Comet Hyakutake (formally designated C/1996 B2 (Hyakutake)) is a comet discovered on 31 January 1996. It was dubbed the Great Comet of 1996; its passage to within  of the Earth on 25 March was one of the closest cometary approaches of the previous 200 years. Reaching an apparent visual magnitude of zero and spanning nearly 80°, Hyakutake appeared very bright in the night sky and was widely seen around the world. The comet temporarily upstaged the much anticipated Comet Hale–Bopp, which was approaching the inner Solar System at the time.

Hyakutake is a long-period comet that passed perihelion on 1 May 1996. Before its most recent passage through the Solar System, its orbital period was about 17,000 years, but the gravitational perturbation of the giant planets has increased this period to 70,000 years. This is the first comet to have an X-ray emission detected, which is most likely the result of ionised solar wind particles interacting with neutral atoms in the coma of the comet.

Discovery 
The comet was discovered on 30 January 1996, by Yuji Hyakutake, an amateur astronomer from southern Japan. He had been searching for comets for years and had moved to Kagoshima Prefecture partly for the dark skies in nearby rural areas. He was using a powerful set of binoculars with  objective lenses to scan the skies on the night of the discovery.

This comet was actually the second Comet Hyakutake; Hyakutake had discovered comet C/1995 Y1 several weeks earlier. While re-observing his first comet (which never became visible to the naked eye) and the surrounding patch of sky, Hyakutake was surprised to find another comet in almost the same position as the first had been. Hardly believing a second discovery so soon after the first, Hyakutake reported his observation to the National Astronomical Observatory of Japan the following morning. Later that day, the discovery was confirmed by independent observations.

At the time of its discovery, the comet was shining at magnitude 11.0 and had a coma approximately 2.5 arcminutes across. It was approximately 2 astronomical units (AU) from the Sun. Later, a precovery image of the comet was found on a photograph taken on January 1, when the comet was about 2.4 AU from the Sun and had a magnitude of 13.3.

Orbit 

When the first calculations of the comet's orbit were made, scientists realized that it was going to pass just 0.1 AU from Earth on 25 March. Only four comets in the previous century had passed closer. Comet Hale–Bopp was already being discussed as a possible "great comet"; the astronomical community eventually realised that Hyakutake might also become spectacular because of its close approach.

Moreover, Comet Hyakutake's orbit meant that it had last been to the inner Solar System approximately 17,000 years earlier. Because it had probably passed close to the Sun several times before, the approach in 1996 would not be a maiden arrival from the Oort cloud, a place where comets with orbital periods of millions of years come from. Comets entering the inner Solar System for the first time may brighten rapidly before fading as they near the Sun, because a layer of highly volatile material evaporates. This was the case with Comet Kohoutek in 1973; it was initially touted as potentially spectacular, but only appeared moderately bright. Older comets show a more consistent brightening pattern. Thus, all indications suggested Comet Hyakutake would be bright.

Besides approaching close to Earth, the comet would also be visible throughout the night to northern hemisphere observers at its closest approach because of its path, passing very close to the pole star. This would be an unusual occurrence, because most comets are close to the Sun in the sky when the comets are at their brightest, leading to the comets appearing in a sky not completely dark.

Earth passage 

Hyakutake became visible to the naked eye in early March 1996. By mid-March, the comet was still fairly unremarkable, shining at 4th magnitude with a tail about 5 degrees long. As it neared its closest approach to Earth, it rapidly became brighter, and its tail grew in length. By March 24, the comet was one of the brightest objects in the night sky, and its tail stretched 35 degrees. The comet had a notably bluish-green colour.

Hyakutake was moving so rapidly across the night sky that its movement could be detected against the stars in just a few minutes; it covered the diameter of a full moon (half a degree) every 30 minutes. Observers estimated its magnitude as around 0, and tail lengths of up to 80 degrees were reported. Its coma, now close to the zenith for observers at mid-northern latitudes, appeared approximately 1.5 to 2 degrees across, roughly four times the diameter of the full moon. The comet's head appeared distinctly blue-green, possibly due to emissions from diatomic carbon (C2) combined with sunlight reflected from dust grains.

Because Hyakutake was at its brightest for only a few days, it did not have time to permeate the public imagination in the way that Comet Hale–Bopp did the following year. Many European observers in particular did not see the comet at its peak because of unfavourable weather conditions.

Perihelion and afterwards 
After its close approach to the Earth, the comet faded to about 2nd magnitude. It reached perihelion on 1 May 1996, brightening again and exhibiting a dust tail in addition to the gas tail seen as it passed the Earth. By this time, however, it was close to the Sun and was not seen as easily. It was observed passing perihelion by the SOHO Sun-observing satellite, which also recorded a large coronal mass ejection being formed at the same time. The comet's distance from the Sun at perihelion was 0.23 AU, well inside the orbit of Mercury.

After its perihelion passage, Hyakutake faded rapidly and was lost to naked-eye visibility by the end of May. Its orbital path carried it rapidly into the southern skies, but following perihelion it became much less monitored. The last known observation of the comet took place on November 2.

Hyakutake had passed through the inner Solar System approximately 17,000 years ago; gravitational interactions with the gas giants during its 1996 passage stretched its orbit greatly, and barycentric fits to the comet's orbit predict it will not return to the inner Solar System again for approximately 70,000 years.

Scientific results

Spacecraft passes through the tail 

The Ulysses spacecraft made an unexpected pass through the tail of the comet on 1 May 1996. Evidence of the encounter was not noticed until 1998. Astronomers analysing old data found that Ulysses instruments had detected a large drop in the number of protons passing, as well as a change in the direction and strength of the local magnetic field. This implied that the spacecraft had crossed the 'wake' of an object, most likely a comet; the object responsible was not immediately identified.

In 2000, two teams independently analyzed the same event. The magnetometer team realized that the changes in the direction of the magnetic field mentioned above agreed with the "draping" pattern expected in a comet's ion, or plasma tail. The magnetometer team looked for likely suspects. The orientation of the ion tail inferred from the magnetic field measurements agreed with the source lying in Comet Hyakutake's orbital plane.

The other team, working on data from the spacecraft's ion composition spectrometer, discovered a sudden large spike in detected levels of ionised particles at the same time. The relative abundances of chemical elements detected indicated that the object responsible was definitely a comet.

Based on the Ulysses encounter, the comet's tail is known to have been at least 570 million km (360 million miles; 3.8 AU) long. This is almost twice as long as the previous longest-known cometary tail, that of the Great Comet of 1843, which was 2 AU long. This  record was broken in 2002 by comet 153P/Ikeya–Zhang, which had a tail-length of at least .

Composition 
Terrestrial observers found ethane and methane in the comet, the first time either of these gases had been detected in a comet. Chemical analysis showed that the abundances of ethane and methane were roughly equal, which may imply that its ices formed in interstellar space, away from the Sun, which would have evaporated these volatile molecules. Hyakutake's ices must have formed at temperatures of 20 K or less, indicating that it probably formed in a denser-than-average interstellar cloud.

The amount of deuterium in the comet's water ices was determined through spectroscopic observations. It was found that the ratio of deuterium to hydrogen (known as the D/H ratio) was about 3, which compares to a value in Earth's oceans of about 1.5. It has been proposed that cometary collisions with Earth might have supplied a large proportion of the water in the oceans, but the high D–H ratio measured in Hyakutake and other comets such as Hale–Bopp and Halley's Comet have caused problems for this theory.

X-ray emission 

One of the great surprises of Hyakutake's passage through the inner Solar System was the discovery that it was emitting X-rays, with observations made using the ROSAT satellite revealing very strong X-ray emission. This was the first time a comet had been seen to do so, but astronomers soon found that almost every comet they looked at was emitting X-rays. The emission from Hyakutake was brightest in a crescent shape surrounding the nucleus with the ends of the crescent pointing away from the Sun.

The cause of the X-ray emission is thought to be a combination of two mechanisms. Interactions between energetic solar wind particles and cometary material evaporating from the nucleus is likely to contribute significantly to this effect. Reflection of solar X-rays is seen in other Solar System objects such as the Moon, but a simple calculation assuming even the highest X-ray reflectivity possible per molecule or dust grain is not able to explain the majority of the observed flux from Hyakutake, as the comet's atmosphere is very tenuous and diffuse. Observations of comet C/1999 S4 (LINEAR) with the Chandra satellite in 2000 determined that X-rays observed from that comet were produced predominantly by charge exchange collisions between highly charged carbon, oxygen and nitrogen minor ions in the solar wind, and neutral water, oxygen and hydrogen in the comet's coma.

Nucleus size and activity 

This size measurement corresponded well with indirect estimates using infrared emission and radio observations.

Most comets undergo outgassing from a small proportion of their surface, but most or all of Hyakutake's surface seemed to have been active. The dust production rate was estimated to be about 2 kg/s at the beginning of March, rising to 3 kg/s as the comet approached perihelion. During the same period, dust ejection velocities increased from 50 m/s to 500 m/s.

Observations of material being ejected from the nucleus allowed astronomers to establish its rotation period. As the comet passed the Earth, a large puff or blob of material was observed being ejected in the sunward direction every 6.23 hours. A second smaller ejection with the same period confirmed this as the rotation period of the nucleus.

See also
 Lists of comets

Notes

 Solution using the Solar System Barycenter. For objects at such high eccentricity, the Sun's barycentric coordinates are more stable than heliocentric coordinates.

References

Further reading

External links 

 JPL Comet Hyakutake home page
 JPL DASTCOM Cometary Orbital Elements
 Cometography.com: Comet Hyakutake
 
 

Non-periodic comets
Science and technology in Japan
19960131
Great comets
Discoveries by Yuji Hyakutake
Discoveries by amateur astronomers